Alex Reid is a British actress, trained at the Webber Douglas Academy of Dramatic Art.

Acting
She portrayed the probation officer Sally in E4's Misfits and also the character of Captain Caroline Walshe in series 1 and 2 of ITV's SAS drama Ultimate Force.

She starred as Mercer in 2001's Arachnid and portrayed Beth O'Brien in 2005's The Descent and was featured in Guinea Pigs. She reprised her role in The Descent Part 2 for a cameo.

Filmography

Film

Television

References

External links
 

People from Penzance
Actresses from Cornwall
English film actresses
English television actresses
Alumni of the Webber Douglas Academy of Dramatic Art
Living people
Year of birth missing (living people)